Leccinum fuscescens is a species of bolete fungus in the family Boletaceae. It was described as new to science in 1968 by mycologists Alexander H. Smith, Harry Delbert Thiers, and Roy Watling.

See also
List of Leccinum species
List of North American boletes

References

fuscescens
Fungi described in 1968
Fungi of North America
Taxa named by Alexander H. Smith
Taxa named by Harry Delbert Thiers
Taxa named by Roy Watling